Capozzoli is an Italian surname. Notable people with the surname include:

Charlie Capozzoli (1931–2013), American long-distance runner 
 Louis Capozzoli (1901–1982), American politician
Marco Capozzoli (born 1988), American football placekicker 

Italian-language surnames